Europe Ablaze is a computer wargame developed and published by Strategic Studies Group for the Commodore 64 and Apple II in 1985. 
It is based on air warfare of World War II.

Gameplay 
Europe Ablaze covers the period 1939 to 1945 and contains three scenarios that depict strategic bombings in Europe during World War II. The scenarios are based on Battle of Britain, Royal Air Force night bombings of summer 1943, and Allied bombings of Germany in 1945.

The game is built on a modified Carriers at War engine. The units of maneuver are air groups with 5 to 40 planes. The player can control forces of either Axis or Allied powers. Each side has one Commander-in-chief slot and up to three air Fleet Commander slots that can be occupied either by human players or by artificial intelligence. 
Each scenario is broken down into days, which in their turn consist of five-minute intervals.

Reception 
Ken McMahon of Commodore User gave the game a rating of 8 out of 10 and described Europe Ablaze as "one of the most extensive and accurate World War II simulations". In Computer Gaming World, Jay Selover praised the game for its multi-player, gameplay variety, and the possibility to create custom scenarios. Computer and Video Games reviewer noted that the game is not for beginners and gave it a score of 7 out of 10. Benn Dunnington of the U.S. magazine .info gave the game three and a half stars and wrote, "Europe Ablaze is about as close as you can get to military board-gaming without a board."

Reviews
The V.I.P. of Gaming Magazine #5 (Sept./Oct., 1986)

References

1985 video games
Strategic Studies Group games
Commodore 64 games
Apple II games
Computer wargames
Strategy video games
Video games developed in Australia
World War II video games